The First Epistle to Timothy is one of three letters in the New Testament of the Bible often grouped together as the pastoral epistles, along with Second Timothy and Titus. The letter, traditionally attributed to the Apostle Paul, consists mainly of counsels to his younger colleague and delegate Timothy regarding his ministry in Ephesus (1:3). These counsels include instructions on the organization of the Church and the responsibilities resting on certain groups of leaders therein as well as exhortations to faithfulness in maintaining the truth amid surrounding errors. Most modern scholars consider the pastoral epistles to have been written after Paul's death, although "a small and declining number of scholars still argue for Pauline authorship".

Authorship

The authorship of First Timothy was traditionally attributed to the Apostle Paul, although in pre-Nicene Christianity this attribution was often in dispute. He is named as the author of the letter in the text (1:1). Nineteenth- and twentieth-century scholarship questioned the authenticity of the letter, with many scholars suggesting that First Timothy, along with Second Timothy and Titus, are not the work of Paul, but to an unidentified Christian writing some time in the late-first to mid-second centuries. Most scholars now affirm this view.

As evidence for this perspective, they put forward that the pastoral epistles contain 306 words that Paul does not use in his unquestioned letters, that their style of writing is different from that of his unquestioned letters, that they reflect conditions and a church organization not current in Paul's day, and that they do not appear in early lists of his canonical works. Modern scholars who support Pauline authorship nevertheless stress their importance regarding the question of authenticity: I. H. Marshall and P. H. Towner wrote that "the key witness is Polycarp, where there is a high probability that 1 and 2 Tim were known to him". Similarly M. W. Holmes argued that it is "virtually certain or highly probable" that Polycarp used 1 and 2 Timothy.

Marcion, an orthodox bishop later excommunicated for heresy, formed an early canon of scripture  around the Gospel of Luke and ten of the canonical Pauline epistles excluding 1–2 Timothy and Titus. The reasons for these exclusions are unknown, and so speculation abounds, including the hypotheses that they were not written until after Marcion's time, or that he knew of them, but regarded them as inauthentic. Proponents of Pauline authorship argue that he had theological grounds for rejecting the pastorals, namely their teaching about the goodness of creation (cf. 1 Timothy 4:1 ff.). The question remains whether Marcion knew these three letters and rejected them as Tertullian says, since in 1 Timothy 6:20 "false opposing arguments" are referred to, with the word for "opposing arguments" being "antithesis", the name of Marcion's work, and so a subtle hint of Marcion's heresy. However, the structure of the Church presupposed is less developed than the one Ignatius of Antioch (who wrote ) presupposes, as well as the fact that not only is "antithesis" itself a Greek word which simply means "opposing arguments" but as it has been noted, the attack on the heretics is not central to the three letters.

Late in the 2nd century there are a number of quotations from all three pastoral epistles in Irenaeus' work Against Heresies. The Muratorian Canon lists the books of the New Testament and ascribes all three pastoral epistles to Paul. Eusebius calls it, along with the other thirteen canonical Pauline epistles, "undisputed". Exceptions to this positive witness include Tatian, as well as the gnostic Basilides. Possible earlier allusions are found in the letters from Clement of Rome to the Corinthians, Ignatius to the Ephesians and Polycarp to the Philippians, although it is difficult to determine the nature of any such literary relationships.

Date
Modern scholars generally place its composition some time in the late 1st century or first half of the 2nd century AD, with a wide margin of uncertainty. The term Gnosis ("knowledge") itself occurs in 1 Timothy 6:20. Likewise, there are a series of verbal agreements between Ignatius and 1 Timothy which cluster around a 14 verse section in 1 Timothy 1. If these parallels between Ignatius and 1 Timothy represent a literary dependence by Ignatius, this would move the date of 1 Timothy even earlier. However, Irenaeus (writing ) is the earliest author to clearly and unequivocally describe the Pastorals.

The earliest known writing of 1 Timothy has been found on Oxyrhynchus Papyrus 5259, designated P133, in 2017. It comes from a leaf of a codex which is dated to the 3rd century.

Outline

Content 
The epistle opens by stating that it was written by Paul, to Timothy. Paul reminds Timothy that he has asked Timothy to stay in Ephesus and prevent false teaching of the law by others. Paul says that law is to be applied to sinners like rebels, murderers, and the sexually immoral. The list of lawbreakers includes the Greek word , which is sometimes translated to mean "homosexual men".

The epistle is well known for what it says about the roles of men and women in its second chapter, particularly the verse 1 Timothy 2:12. In the NIV translation this verse reads:
The epistle justifies this by saying that Adam was formed before Eve, and that Eve was tricked by the serpent.

Leaders of the church are to conduct themselves in a manner worthy of respect, avoiding overindulgence in wine and managing their affairs well. Timothy is advised to avoid false teachings and focus on the truth.

The author discusses a list of widows to be supported by the church, setting restrictions on the types of women to help: only old widows who never remarry and who prioritize their family are to receive help. Widows younger than sixty have sensual desires that may cause them to remarry.

Slaves should respect their masters, especially if their masters are believers. People should avoid envy and avoid the temptation to focus on becoming rich because "the love of money is the root of all kinds of evil."

In closing, Timothy is told he should continue to "fight the good fight of the faith" by helping others to be virtuous and by running his church well.

Music 
Several composers, including Johann Sebastian Bach, set a line from the epistle as a Christmas cantata, including Stölzel's  beginning with 1 Timothy 3:16.

See also
 1 Timothy 2:12
 An Historical Account of Two Notable Corruptions of Scripture
 Pseudepigrapha
 Second Epistle to Timothy
 Textual variants in the New Testament#First Epistle to Timothy

Notes

References

External links

 First Timothy texts and resources
  Various versions

 
2nd-century Christian texts
Canonical epistles
Timothy 1
Pastoral epistles